Pardes is a 1997 Indian Hindi-language musical drama film directed, produced, and co-written by Subhash Ghai. Distributed by Mukta Arts, it stars Shah Rukh Khan, and newcomers Mahima Chaudhry and Apurva Agnihotri in lead roles, with Alok Nath, Amrish Puri and Himani Shivpuri in supporting roles. The film was shot at various locations in the United States (Los Angeles, Las Vegas), Canada (British Columbia, including Vancouver) and India (Uttarakhand and Uttar Pradesh, including Agra).

Pardes theatrically released in India on 8 August 1997. It received mixed-to-positive reviews from critics, with praise for its soundtrack and Khan, Chaudhry, and Agnihotri's performances; however its story and screenplay received criticism. It grossed over  worldwide, emerging as a commercial success, and was the fourth highest-grossing Bollywood film of 1997, behind Dil To Pagal Hai (also starring Khan), Border, and Ishq. 

At the 43rd Filmfare Awards, Pardes received 12 nominations, including Best Film, Best Director (Ghai) and Best Actress (Chaudhry), and won 3 awards – Best Female Debut (Chaudhry), Best Female Playback Singer (Alka Yagnik for "Meri Mehbooba") and Best Screenplay (Ghai).

The film was remade in Telugu as Pelli Kanuka (1998) starring Jagapati Babu, Lakshmi & Banumathi Ramakrishna. It was released on the eve of celebration of 50th anniversary of the Indian independence.

Plot
Arjun is the foster son of Kishorilal, a wealthy NRI who harbours affection for his home-country, India. On a trip to meet his friend in India, Kishorilal comes in contact with his friend's daughter, Ganga. He is impressed by her culture and values, and decides to arrange her marriage with his real son, Rajiv.

Arjun is tasked to prepare Ganga's family to receive Rajiv when he arrives. Arjun sets about "westernizing" the household, but is resisted by Ganga and her siblings. Their clash brings them together, and Arjun and Ganga become friends. Rajiv visits the village in a month's time, and is subjected to alien Indian customs and traditions. With help from Arjun, he soon begins to understand Indian culture and becomes attracted to Ganga.

Rajiv and Ganga agree to their arranged marriage, and fly off together to the US after being engaged in India. Ganga lives with the Kishorilal household while preparations are made for a grand wedding. During this time, she faces hostilities from Kishorilal's family, who have long left India and its values behind, having fully embraced American culture. Ganga believes Rajiv is different from his family, but is soon exposed to his indulgent lifestyle, his brattish behaviour and secrets of his past relationships. Having grown up in a conservative family in India, she reacts negatively to this new information and lashes out at Arjun, accusing him of painting a false picture of Rajiv before their engagement.

Arjun's continued friendship with Ganga is noticed by Kishorilal's family, and they relocate him within the country so he cannot interfere in Rajiv's relationship. On a trip to Las Vegas, Rajiv and Ganga end up fighting in their hotel room over the former's insistence to have sex before marriage. Rajiv goes as far as to say insulting things about India, causing Ganga to get infuriated and slap him and subsequently cancel her relationship with him by discarding her ring. Rajiv ends up attempting assault on Ganga, who fights him off and escapes. Arjun finds her in a distressed state at a train station, and flies her back to the safety of her family in India.

Back in the village, Ganga's family are falsely led to believe that Arjun and Ganga have eloped. Rajiv shows up in the country, and hires goons to take revenge on Arjun. Arjun is left a bloody mess, but fights back for Ganga's sake. His fistfight with Rajiv turns violent, but they are interrupted by Kishorilal. Kishorilal demands an explanation from Arjun for his actions, who confesses that he has fallen in love with Ganga but acted only with an intent to protect her (and not elope with her). Ganga, meanwhile, has also realized her love for Arjun. She exposes Rajiv to her family for his actions in Vegas. Kishorilal is disgusted and slaps Rajiv and orders him to go back to the US. Ganga and Arjun return to the US and get married. They live out a happy married life together.

Cast
Shah Rukh Khan as Arjun Saagar
Mahima Chaudhry as Kusum Ganga 
Apurva Agnihotri as Rajiv Lal 
Amrish Puri as Kishorilal
Alok Nath as Suraj Dev, Ganga's father.
Padmavati Rao as Narmada 
Dina Pathak as Dadi Maa
Himani Shivpuri as Kulwanti
Madhuri Bhatia as Neeta Sandiplal, Arjun's foster aunt.
Smita Jaykar as Padma
Pawan Malhotra as Sharafat Ali
Prachi Save as Daksha
Aditya Narayan as Potla
Ajay Nagrath as Dabboo
Samta Sagar as Sonali Shahi
Subhash Ghai as singer in a boat
Remo D'Souza as Dancer
Rakesh Thareja as Shekhar Paul, Rajiv's friend.
Ruhshad Nariman Daruwalla as Vikrant Pathak, Potla's friend.
Akash as Karnataki              
Richa Anderson as Kelly, Rajiv's ex girlfriend.
Sukhwinder Singh Chahal as Ramu
Deepak Qazir as Amirchand
Vinod Raut as Garibchand
Anand Balraj as Manuchand

Soundtrack

The soundtrack was composed by Nadeem-Shravan and the lyrics were penned by Anand Bakshi. For their work, Nadeem-Shravan received a Filmfare Award for Best Music Director nomination and won a Screen Award for Best Music Director. This was the only album where K.S. Chithra sung a Hindi song for Nadeem-Shravan.

Ghai wanted A. R. Rahman to compose the music of this film, but he was too expensive and didn't fit the budget of the film. However, they collaborated on Ghai's next, Taal (1999).

Track list

Reception
Planet Bollywood started their review by saying, "The music of Pardes is one of Nadeem-Shravan's best ever."

Box office
It is the 4th-highest-grossing film of 1997 worldwide.

India
It opened on Friday, August 8, 1997, across 210 screens, and earned  nett on its opening day. It grossed  nett in its opening weekend, and had a first week of  nett. The film earned a total of  nett, and was declared a "super-hit" by Box Office India. It is the 4th highest-grossing film of 1997 in India.

Overseas
It earned  ( in 1997) outside India. Overseas, it is the 2nd highest-grossing film of 1997 after Dil To Pagal Hai, which grossed  ( in 1997).

Critical reception
Pardes received mixed-to-positive reviews from critics. Praise was given to the music and the cast's performances; however the story and screenplay of the film received criticism.

India Today cites it as one of the first major Bollywood pictures to succeed in the United States.

In their book, New Cosmopolitanisms: South Asians in the US, Gita Rajan and Shailja Sharma view the film as a dichotomous depiction of the good NRI versus bad NRI, with Khan depicting the good immigrant, who assists the rowdy Indian American playboy Rajiv (Apurva Agnihotri), the bad. Khan's character of Arjun is perceived as a metaphor for cosmopolitanism or Indian cultural nationalism in the wider sense, in direct contrast to Rajiv who represents wealthy Westernization and all its negative vices and connotations.

Accolades

Notes

References

Bibliography

External links
 

1990s Hindi-language films
1997 films
Films directed by Subhash Ghai
Films scored by Nadeem–Shravan
1997 romantic drama films
Films set in the United States
Hindi films remade in other languages
Indian romantic drama films
Films shot in Vancouver
Films shot in Uttarakhand
Films shot in Uttar Pradesh
Films shot in Los Angeles
Films shot in Agra
Films shot in the Las Vegas Valley
Films shot in Nevada
Films set in Uttar Pradesh
Films set in the Las Vegas Valley
Films set in Nevada
Foreign films set in the United States